Foundations of Chemistry is a triannual peer-reviewed academic journal covering conceptual and fundamental issues related to chemistry, including philosophy and history of chemistry, and chemistry education. The founding and current editor-in-chief is Eric Scerri. According to the Journal Citation Reports, the journal has a 2020 impact factor of 1.263.

References

External links 
 

History of science journals
Chemistry journals
Triannual journals
English-language journals
Springer Science+Business Media academic journals
Publications established in 1999